Vladis-Emmerson Mishelevych Illoy-Ayyet (born 7 October 1995), commonly known as Emmerson, is a professional football defender who plays for Russian club FC Ural Yekaterinburg. Born in Ukraine, he has represented the Republic of Congo at senior level.

Career

Club
Illoy-Ayyet is a product of the youth team system of FC Chornomorets. But he never made a debut for FC Chornomorets main-squad team; in February 2015 he signed a contract with FC Karpaty. From March 2015 he played on loan for FC Nyva Ternopil.

On 4 July 2019, Hong Kong Premier League club R&F announced the acquisition for Emmerson on a year-long loan. He left the club in January 2020 and was instead loaned out to Russian club FC Armavir for the rest of the season. On 15 April 2020, FC Armavir dropped out of the Russian Football National League due to lack of financing.

On 31 May 2022, Emmerson signed a long-term contract with Russian Premier League club FC Ural Yekaterinburg.

International
In August 2017 he was called up by Congo national football team for matches of 2018 FIFA World Cup qualification against Ghana.

Career statistics

Club

International goals
Scores and results list Congo's goal tally first.

Personal life
Illoy-Ayyet was born in Ukraine from a Ukrainian mother and a Congolese father.

References

External links

Profile at FFU Official Site (Ukr)

1995 births
Footballers from Odesa
Ukrainian people of Republic of the Congo descent
Republic of the Congo people of Ukrainian descent
Living people
Ukrainian footballers
Ukraine youth international footballers
Republic of the Congo footballers
Republic of the Congo international footballers
Association football defenders
FC Chornomorets Odesa players
FC Nyva Ternopil players
FC Olimpik Donetsk players
Vejle Boldklub players
R&F (Hong Kong) players
FC Armavir players
FC SKA-Khabarovsk players
FC Ural Yekaterinburg players
Ukrainian First League players
Ukrainian Premier League players
Danish Superliga players
Hong Kong Premier League players
Russian First League players
Russian Premier League players
Ukrainian expatriate footballers
Republic of the Congo expatriate footballers
Expatriate men's footballers in Denmark
Ukrainian expatriate sportspeople in Denmark
Republic of the Congo expatriate sportspeople in Denmark
Expatriate footballers in Hong Kong
Ukrainian expatriate sportspeople in Hong Kong
Republic of the Congo expatriate sportspeople in Hong Kong
Expatriate footballers in Russia
Ukrainian expatriate sportspeople in Russia
Republic of the Congo expatriate sportspeople in Russia